Malu Roșu may refer to several villages in Romania:

Malu Roșu, a village in Armășești Commune, Ialomița County
Malu Roșu, a village in Mărunței Commune, Olt County
Malu Roșu, a village in Ceptura Commune, Prahova County

See also 
 Malu (disambiguation)